The 1921 Major League Baseball season, ended when the New York Giants beat the New York Yankees in Game 8 of the World Series. 1921 was the first of three straight seasons in which the Yankees would lead the majors in wins. Babe Ruth broke the single season home run record for the third consecutive season by hitting 59 home runs in 152 games. Ruth also broke Roger Connor's record for the most home runs all time when he hit his 139th home run on July 18 against Bert Cole. The record for career strikeouts, previously held by Cy Young was also broken in 1921 by Walter Johnson; Johnson lead the league in strikeouts with 143 and ended the season with 2,835 strikeouts. Young struck out 2,803 during his career. The Cincinnati Reds set a Major League record for the fewest strikeouts in a season, with only 308. Future Hall of Famers Kiki Cuyler and Goose Goslin both debuted in September 1921.

Standings

American League

National League

Postseason

Bracket

MLB statistical leaders

Managers

American League

National League

Events
August 5 – The Pittsburgh Pirates 8–5 victory over the Philadelphia Phillies at Forbes Field is the first Major League game to be broadcast on radio. Harold Arlin calls the game for Pittsburgh station KDKA.

References

External links
1921 Major League Baseball season schedule at Baseball Reference

 
Major League Baseball seasons